The 2018 IFCPF CP Football Americas Championship was an American championship for men's national 7-a-side association football teams. IFCPF stands for International Federation of Cerebral Palsy Football. Athletes with a physical disability competed. The Championship took place in Ecuador from 27 October to 3 November 2018.

CP Football was played with modified FIFA rules. Among the modifications were that there were seven players, no offside, a smaller playing field, and permission for one-handed throw-ins. Matches consisted of two thirty-minute halves, with a fifteen-minute half-time break. The Championships was a qualifying event for the 2019 IFCPF CP Football World Championships.

Participating teams and officials

Teams

The draw
During the draw, the teams were divided into pots because of rankings. Here, the following groups:

Squads
The individual teams contact following football gamblers on to:

Group A

Group B

Venues
The venues to be used for the Americas Championships were located in Sangolquí.

Format

The group stage was a competition between the 8 teams divided among two groups of four, where each group engaged in a round-robin tournament within itself.

The first-placed teams played in the final for the first place, the next two teams played for the position five to eight.

Classification
Athletes with a physical disability competed. The athlete's disability was caused by a non-progressive brain damage that affects motor control, such as cerebral palsy, traumatic brain injury or stroke. Athletes must be ambulant.

Players were classified by level of disability.
C5: Athletes with difficulties when walking and running, but not in standing or when kicking the ball.
C6: Athletes with control and co-ordination problems of their upper limbs, especially when running.
C7: Athletes with hemiplegia.
C8: Athletes with minimal disability; must meet eligibility criteria and have an impairment that has impact on the sport of football.

Teams must field at least one class C5 or C6 player at all times. No more than two players of class C8 are permitted to play at the same time.

Group stage
The group stage, have seen the 8 teams divided into two groups of four teams.

Group A

Group B

Knockout stage

Semi-finals
Position 5-8

Position 1-4

Finals
Position 7-8

Position 5-6

Position 3-4

Final

Statistics

Ranking

See also

References

External links
Cerebral Palsy International Sports & Recreation Association (CPISRA)
International Federation of Cerebral Palsy Football (IFCPF)

2018 in association football
2018
2018 in Ecuadorian football
Paralympic association football